Vincent Paul Whelan (July 19, 1877 – November 21, 1946) was an American football player and coach.  He was the head football coachat Allegheny College in Meadville, Pennsylvania. He held that position for the 1902 season. His coaching record at Allegheny was 7–3.

Whelan was a member of the Phi Gamma Delta fraternity. He died in Palm Beach, Florida in 1946.

References

1877 births
1946 deaths
American football quarterbacks
Allegheny Gators football coaches
Washington & Jefferson Presidents football players
Players of American football from Youngstown, Ohio